Vahagnadzor (formerly, Shagali) is a town in the Lori Province of Armenia. The town has a ruined fortress.

References 

Populated places in Lori Province